Gangaridai (Latin: Gangaridae) is a term used by the ancient Greco-Roman writers (1st century BCE-2nd century AD) to describe a people or a geographical region of the ancient Indian subcontinent. Some of these writers state that Alexander the Great withdrew from the Indian subcontinent because of the strong war elephant force of the Gangaridai.

A number of modern scholars locate Gangaridai in the Ganges Delta of the Bengal region, although alternative theories also exist. Gange or Ganges, the capital of the Gangaridai (according to Ptolemy), has been identified with several sites in the region, including Chandraketugarh and Wari-Bateshwar.

Names 

The Greek writers use the names "Gandaridae" (Diodorus), "Gandaritae", and "Gandridae" (Plutarch) to describe these people. The ancient Latin writers use the name "Gangaridae", a term that seems to have been coined by the 1st century poet Virgil.

Some modern etymologies of the word Gangaridai split it as "Gaṅgā-rāṣṭra", "Gaṅgā-rāḍha" or "Gaṅgā-hṛdaya". For example, it has been suggested that Gangarid is a Greek formation of the Indian word "Ganga-hṛd", meaning 'the land with the Ganges at its heart'. The meaning fits well with the description of the region given by the author of Periplus. However, historian D. C. Sircar believes that the word is simply the plural form of "Gangarid" (derived from the base "Ganga"), and means "Ganga (Ganges) people".

Some earlier scholars considered "Gangaridae" as a corruption of or distinct from "Gandaridae", a region they located in north-western part of the Indian subcontinent. For example, W. W. Tarn (1948) equated the term with Gandhara; and T.R. Robinson (1993) equated it to Gandaris or Gandarae, an area in present-day Punjab mentioned by ancient Greek writers. However, the ancient Greco-Roman works make it clear that Gandaridae was located in the Ganges plain: it was another name for Gangaridae, and was different from Gandhara and Gandaris.

Greek accounts 

Several ancient Greek writers mention Gangaridai, but their accounts are largely based on hearsay.

Diodorus 

The earliest surviving description of Gangaridai appears in Bibliotheca historica of writer Diodorus Siculus (69 BCE-16AD). This account is based on a now-lost work, probably the writings of either Megasthenes or Hieronymus of Cardia.

In Book 2 of Bibliotheca historica, Diodorus states that "Gandaridae" (i.e. Gangaridai) territory was located to the east of the Ganges river, which was 30 stades wide. He mentions that no foreign enemy had ever conquered Gandaridae, because it of its strong elephant force. He further states that Alexander the Great advanced up to Ganges after subjugating other Indians, but decided to retreat when he heard that the Gandaridae had 4,000 elephants.

In Book 17 of Bibliotheca historica, Diodorus once again describes the "Gandaridae", and states that Alexander had to retreat after his soldiers refused to take an expedition against the Gandaridae. The book (17.91.1) also mentions that a nephew of Porus fled to the land of the Gandaridae, although C. Bradford Welles translates the name of this land as "Gandara".

In Book 18 of Bibliotheca historica, Diodorus describes India as a large kingdom comprising several nations, the largest of which was "Tyndaridae" (which seems to be a scribal error for "Gandaridae"). He further states that a river separated this nation from their neighbouring territory; this 30-stadia wide river was the greatest river in this region of India (Diodorus does not mention the name of the river in this book). He goes on to mention that Alexander did not campaign against this nation, because they had a large number of elephants. The Book 18 description is as follows:

Diodorus' account of India in the Book 2 is based on Indica, a book written by the 4th century BCE writer Megasthenes, who actually visited India. Megasthenes' Indica is now lost, although it has been reconstructed from the writings of Diodorus and other later writers. J. W. McCrindle (1877) attributed Diodorus' Book 2 passage about the Gangaridai to Megasthenes in his reconstruction of Indica. However, according to A. B. Bosworth (1996), Diodorus' source for the information about the Gangaridai was Hieronymus of Cardia (354–250 BCE), who was a contemporary of Alexander and the main source of information for Diodorus' Book 18. Bosworth points out that Diodorus describes Ganges as 30 stadia wide; but it is well-attested by other sources that Megasthenes described the median (or minimum) width of Ganges as 100 stadia. This suggests that Diodorus obtained the information about the Gandaridae from another source, and appended it to Megasthenes' description of India in Book 2.

Plutarch 

Plutarch (46-120 CE) mentions the Gangaridai as "'Gandaritae" (in Parallel Lives - Life of Alexander 62.3) and as "Gandridae" (in Moralia 327b.).

Other writers 

Ptolemy (2nd century CE), in his Geography, states that the Gangaridae occupied "all the region about the mouths of the Ganges". He names a city called Gange as their capital. This suggests that Gange was the name of a city, derived from the name of the river. Based on the city's name, the Greek writers used the word "Gangaridai" to describe the local people.

The Periplus of the Erythraean Sea does not mention the Gangaridai, but attests the existence of a city that the Greco-Romans described as "Ganges":

Dionysius Periegetes (2nd-3rd century CE) mentions "Gargaridae" located near the "gold-bearing Hypanis" (Beas) river. "Gargaridae" is sometimes believed to be a variant of "Gangaridae", but another theory identifies it with Gandhari people. A. B. Bosworth dismisses Dionysius' account as "a farrago of nonsense", noting that he inaccurately describes the Hypanis river as flowing down into the Gangetic plain.

Gangaridai also finds a mention in Greek mythology. In Apollonius of Rhodes' Argonautica (3rd century BCE), Datis, a chieftain, leader of the Gangaridae who was in the army of Perses III, fought against Aeetes during the Colchian civil war. Colchis was situated in modern-day Georgia, on the east of the Black Sea. Aeetes was the famous king of Colchia against whom Jason and the Argonauts undertook their expedition in search of the "Golden Fleece". Perses III was the brother of Aeetes and king of the Taurian tribe.

Roman accounts 

The Roman poet Virgil speaks of the valour of the Gangaridae in his Georgics (c. 29 BCE).

Quintus Curtius Rufus (possibly 1st century CE) noted the two nations Gangaridae and Prasii:

Pliny the Elder (23–79 CE) states:

Identification 

The ancient Greek writers provide vague information about the centre of the Gangaridai power. As a result, the later historians have put forward various theories about its location.

Gangetic plains 

Pliny (1st century CE) in his NH, terms the Gangaridai as the novisima gens (nearest people) of the Ganges river. It cannot be determined from his writings whether he means "nearest to the mouth" or "nearest to the headwaters". But the later writer Ptolemy (2nd century CE), in his Geography, explicitly locates the Gangaridai near the mouths of the Ganges.

A. B. Bosworth notes that the ancient Latin writers almost always use the word "Gangaridae" to define the people, and associate them with the Prasii people. According to Megasthenes, who actually lived in India, the Prasii people lived near the Ganges. Besides, Pliny explicitly mentions that the Gangaridae lived beside the Ganges, naming their capital as Pertalis. All these evidences suggest that the Gangaridae lived in the Gangetic plains.

Rarh region 

Diodorus (1st century BCE) states that the Ganges river formed the eastern boundary of the Gangaridai. Based on Diodorus's writings and the identification of Ganges with Bhāgirathi-Hooghly (a western distributary of Ganges), Gangaridai can be identified with the Rarh region in West Bengal.

Larger part of Bengal 

The Rarh is located to the west of the Bhāgirathi-Hooghly (Ganges) river. However, Plutarch (1st century CE), Curtius (possibly 1st century CE) and Solinus (3rd century CE), suggest that Gangaridai was located on the eastern banks of the Gangaridai river. Historian R. C. Majumdar theorized that the earlier historians like Diodorus used the word Ganga for the Padma River (an eastern distributary of Ganges).

Pliny names five mouths of the Ganges river, and states that the Gangaridai occupied the entire region about these mouths. He names five mouths of Ganges as Kambyson, Mega, Kamberikon, Pseudostomon and Antebole. These exact present-day locations of these mouths cannot be determined with certainty because of the changing river courses. According to D. C. Sircar, the region encompassing these mouths appears to be the region lying between the Bhāgirathi-Hooghly River in the west and the Padma River in the east. This suggests that the Gangaridai territory included the coastal region of present-day West Bengal and Bangladesh, up to the Padma river in the east. Gaurishankar De and Subhradip De believe that the five mouths may refer to the Bidyadhari, Jamuna and other branches of Bhāgirathi-Hooghly at the entrance of Bay of Bengal.

According to the archaeologist Dilip Kumar Chakrabarti, the centre of the Gangaridai power was located in vicinity of Adi Ganga (a now dried-up flow of the Hooghly river). Chakrabarti considers Chandraketugarh as the strongest candidate for the centre, followed by Mandirtala. James Wise believed that Kotalipara in present-day Bangladesh was the capital of Gangaridai. Archaeologist Habibullah Pathan identified the Wari-Bateshwar ruins as the Gangaridai territory.

North-western India 

William Woodthorpe Tarn (1948) identifies the "Gandaridae" mentioned by Diodorus with the people of Gandhara. Historian T. R. Robinson (1993) locates the Gangaridai to the immediately east of the Beas River, in the Punjab region. According to him, the unnamed river described in Diodorus' Book 18 is Beas (Hyphasis); Diodorus misinterpreted his source, and incompetently combined it with other material from Megasthenes, erroneously naming the river as Ganges in Book 2. Robinson identified the Gandaridae with the ancient Yaudheyas.

A. B. Bosworth (1996) rejects this theory, pointing out that Diodorus describes the unnamed river in Book 18 as the greatest river in the region. But Beas is not the largest river in its region. Even if one excludes the territory captured by Alexander in "the region" (thus excluding the Indus River), the largest river in the region is Chenab (Acesines). Robison argues that Diodorus describes the unnamed river as "the greatest river in its own immediate area", but Bosworth believes that this interpretation is not supported by Diodorus's wording. Bosworth also notes that Yaudheyas were an autonomous confederation, and do not match the ancient descriptions that describe Gandaridae as part of a strong kingdom.

Other 

According to Nitish K. Sengupta, it is possible that the term "Gangaridai" refers to the whole of northern India from the Beas River to the western part of Bengal.

Pliny mentions the Gangaridae and the Calingae (Kalinga) together. One interpretation based on this reading suggests that Gangaridae and the Calingae were part of the Kalinga tribe, which spread into the Ganges delta. N. K. Sahu of Utkal University identifies Gangaridae as the northern part of Kalinga.

Political status 

Diodorus mentions Gangaridai and Prasii as one nation, naming Xandramas as the king of this nation. Diodorus calls them "two nations under one king." Historian A. B. Bosworth believes that this is a reference to the Nanda dynasty, and the Nanda territory matches the ancient descriptions of kingdom in which the Gangaridae were located.

According to Nitish K. Sengupta, it is possible that Gangaridai and Prasii are actually two different names of the same people, or closely allied people. However, this cannot be said with certainty.

Historian Hem Chandra Raychaudhuri writes: "It may reasonably be inferred from the statements of the Greek and Latin writers that about the time of Alexander's invasion, the Gangaridai were a very powerful nation, and either formed a dual monarchy with the Pasioi [Prasii], or were closely associated with them on equal terms in a common cause against the foreign invader.

References

Citations

Sources 

 
 
 
 
 
 
 
 
 
 
 
 
 

Ancient Bengal
Historical Indian regions